Newcastle Jets Youth is the youth system of Newcastle Jets Football Club based Newcastle, New South Wales, Australia. The academy teams play in the A-League Youth, NSW League Two (in youth team & U20) and Football NSW Youth League Two (U18, U16, U15, U14 & U13 age brackets).

Youth team history
The team was founded in 2008, as a Newcastle Jets representative team for the inaugural season of the National Youth League/Y-League/A-League Youth competition.
On 19 September 2013, it was confirmed that the team would compete in the National Premier Leagues Northern NSW competition from 2014 to 2019. They played in the National Premier Leagues Northern NSW from 2014 to 2019, with the majority of their home games at Jack McLaughlan Oval.

For the 2020 season, they transferred to the National Premier Leagues NSW, within the newly created NPL4 Division. They were promoted to the NPL2 Division mid-season, when the 2020 season resumed in July.

Youth current squad
''These players can also play with the senior squad and are all Young Professionals.

Stadium
The team previously hosted its home matches at Wanderers Oval in Broadmeadow and at Adamstown Oval in Adamstown, both within the city of Newcastle. For the 2017–18 season, both the Youth and A-League Women teams moved to the No.2 Sportsground in Newcastle West, though the youth team would continue to train out of their training base at the University of Newcastle.

Current staff

Honours
Youth
 National Premier Leagues Northern NSW Premiership
 Premiers (1): 2014
 NSW League Three Premiership
 Premiers (1): 2022 
 NSW League Three Championship
 Champions (1): 2022 

Under-23s
 Y-League/A-League Youth Premiership
 Runners-up (1): 2013–14

Academy
 National Premier Leagues Northern NSW U-20 Premiership
Premiers (1): 2014
Runners-up (2): 2016, 2019
 National Premier Leagues Northern NSW U-20 Championship
Champions (1): 2016
Runners-up (1): 2014
 NSW League Three U-20
 Premiers (1): 2022 
 Champions (1): 2022 
 National Premier Leagues Northern NSW U-18 Premiership
Premiers (3): 2017, 2018, 2019
Runners-up (1): 2015
 National Premier Leagues Northern NSW U-18 Championship
Champions (1): 2018
Runners-up (2): 2015, 2017

References

External links
 Official website

Newcastle Jets FC
National Premier Leagues clubs
Soccer clubs in Newcastle, New South Wales
Association football clubs established in 2008
2008 establishments in Australia
A-League National Youth League